The Syriac Orthodox Church, officially known as the Syriac Orthodox Patriarchate of Antioch and All the East, and informally as the Jacobite Church, is an Oriental Orthodox church that branched from the Church of Antioch. The bishop of Antioch, known as the patriarch, heads the church and possesses apostolic succession through Saint Peter, according to sacred tradition. The church upholds Miaphysite doctrine in Christology, and employs the Divine Liturgy of Saint James, associated with James, the brother of Jesus. Classical Syriac is the official and liturgical language of the church.

The church gained its hierarchical distinctiveness in 512, when pro-Chalcedonian patriarch Flavian II of Antioch was deposed by Byzantine emperor Anastasius I Dicorus, and a synod was held at Laodicea in Syria in order to choose his successor, a prominent Miaphysite theologian Severus the Great (d. 538). His later deposition (in 518) was not recognized by the Miaphisite party, and thus a distinctive (autocephalous) miaphysite patriarchate was established, headed by Severus and his successors. During the sixth century, miaphysite hierarchical structure in the region was further straightened by Jacob Baradaeus (d. 578), while the pro-Chalcedonian faction would form to become the Greek Orthodox Church of Antioch (part of the wider Eastern Orthodox Church).

In 1662, the vacant Syriac Patriarchate of Antioch was filled by individuals who aligned themselves with the Catholic Church. Andrew Akijan was elected in that year, and was succeeded by another Catholic in Gregory Peter VI Shahbaddin. The non-Catholic Syriac party elected the rival Abdulmasih I, Shahbaddin's uncle, as a competing patriarch. Upon Shahbaddin's death in 1702, the Catholic line died out for several decades until the Holy Synod in 1782 elected Michael III Jarweh, who again aligned the Syriacs with the pope. Following a period of violence and intrigue, the non-Catholic party was again recognized with their own patriarch and the Catholic line continued independently as the Syriac Catholic Church.

Mor Hananyo Monastery was the headquarters of the church from  until 1932. The patriarchate was transferred to Homs due to the Sayfo genocide and the effects of World War I. The current see of the church is the Cathedral of Saint George, Bab Tuma, Damascus, Syria, since 1959. Since 2014, Ignatius Aphrem II is the current Patriarch of Antioch. The church has archdioceses and patriarchal vicariates in countries covering six continents. Being an active member of the World Council of Churches, the church participates in various ecumenical dialogues with other churches.

Name and identity

Syriac-speaking Christians have referred to themselves as "Ārāmāyē/Āṯūrāyē/Sūryāyē" in native Aramaic terms based on their ethnic identity. In most languages besides English, a unique name has long been used to distinguish the church from the polity of Syria. In Arabic (the official language of Syria), the church is known as the "Kenissa Suryaniya" as the term "Suryani" identifies the Syriac language and people. Chalcedonians referred to the church as "Jacobite" (after Jacob Baradaeus) since the schism that followed the 451 Council of Chalcedon. English-speaking historians identified the church as the "Syrian Church". The English term "Syrian" was used to describe the community of Syriacs in ancient Syria. In the 15th century, the term "Orthodox" (from Greek: "orthodoxía"; "correct opinion") was used to identify churches that practiced the set of doctrines believed by the early Christians. Since 1922, the term "Syrian" started being used for things named after the Syrian Federation. Hence, in 2000, the Holy Synod ruled that the church be named as "Syriac Orthodox Church" after the Syriac language, the official liturgical language of the church.

The church is not ethnically exclusive, but two main ethnic groups in the community contest their ethnic identification as "Assyrians" and "Arameans". "Suryoye" is the term used to identify the Syriacs in the diaspora. The Syriac Orthodox identity included auxiliary cultural traditions of the Assyrian Empire and Aramean kingdoms. Church traditions crystallized into ethnogenesis through the preservation of their stories and customs by the 12th century. Since the 1910s, the identity of Syriac Orthodoxy in the Ottoman Empire was principally religious and linguistic.

In recent works, Assyrian-American historian Sargon Donabed has pointed out that parishes in the US were originally using Assyrian designations in their official English names, also noting that in some cases those designations were later changed to Syrian, and then to Syriac, while several other parishes still continue to use Assyrian designations.

History

Early history
The church claims apostolic succession through the pre-Chalcedonian Patriarchate of Antioch to the Early Christian communities from Jerusalem led by Saint Barnabas and Saint Paul in Antioch, during the Apostolic era, as described in the Acts of the Apostles; "The disciples were first called Christians in Antioch" (New Testament). Saint Peter was selected by Jesus Christ (New Testament) and is venerated as the first bishop of Antioch in  after the Incident at Antioch.

Saint Evodius was Bishop of Antioch until 66 AD and was succeeded by Saint Ignatius of Antioch. The earliest recorded use of the term "Christianity" was by Ignatius of Antioch, in around 100 AD. In A.D 169, Theophilus of Antioch wrote three apologetic tracts to Autolycus. Patriarch Babylas of Antioch was considered the first saint recorded as having had his remains moved or "translated" for religious purposes—a practice that was to become extremely common in later centuries. Eustathius of Antioch supported Athanasius of Alexandria who opposed the followers of the condemned doctrine of Arius (Arian controversy) at the First Council of Nicaea. During the time of Meletius of Antioch the church split due to his being deposed for Homoiousian leanings—which became known as the Meletian Schism and saw several groups and several claimants to the See of Antioch.

Patriarchate of Antioch

Given the antiquity of the Bishopric of Antioch and the importance of the Christian community in the city of Antioch, a commercially significant city in the eastern parts of the Roman Empire, the First Council of Nicaea (325) recognized the Bishopric as one of main regional primacies in Christendom, with jurisdiction over the administrative Diocese of the Orient, thus laying the foundation for the creation of the "Patriarchate of Antioch and All of the East". Because of the significance attributed to Ignatius of Antioch in the church, most of the Syriac Orthodox patriarchs since 1293 have used the name of Ignatius in the title of the Patriarch preceding their own Patriarchal name.

Christological controversies that followed the Council of Chalcedon (451) resulted in a long struggle for the Patriarchate between those who accepted and those who rejected the council. In 512, pro-Chalcedonian patriarch Flavian II of Antioch was deposed by Emperor Anastasius I (d. 518), and new patriarch Severus of Antioch (d. 538) was chosen to succeed him. On 6 November 512, at the synod of Laodicea in Syria, a prominent miapyhsite theologian Severus the Great was elected, and consecrated on 16 November at the Great Church of Antioch. In 518, he was exiled from Antioch, by new emperor Justin I (d. 527), who tried to enforce a uniform Chalcedonian orthodoxy throughout the empire. Those who belonged to the pro-Chalcedonian party accepted newly appointed patriarch Paul, who took over the see of Antioch. The miaphisite patriarchate was thus forced to move from Antioch with Severus the Great who took refuge in Alexandria. The non-Chalcedonian community was divided between "Severians" (followers of Severus), and aphthartodocetae, and that division remained unresolved until 527. Severians continued to recognize Severus as the legitimate miaphysite Patriarch of Antioch until his death in 538, and then proceeded to follow his successors.

Bishop Jacob Baradaeus (died 578) is credited for ordaining most of the miaphysite hierarchy while facing heavy persecution in the sixth century. In 544, Jacob Baradeus ordained Sergius of Tella continuing the non-Chalcedonian succession of patriarchs of the Church of Antioch. That was done in opposition to the government-backed Patriarchate of Antioch held by the pro-Chalcedonian believers leading to the Syriac Orthodox Church being known popularly as the "Jacobite" Church, while the Chalcedonian believers were known popularly as Melkites—coming from the Syriac word for king (malka), an implication of the Chalcedonian Church's relationship to the Roman Emperor (later emphasised by the Melkite Greek Catholic Church). Because of many historical upheavals and consequent hardships that the Syriac Orthodox Church had to undergo, the patriarchate was transferred to different monasteries in Mesopotamia for centuries. John III of the Sedre was elected and consecrated Patriarch after the death of Athanasius I Gammolo in 631 A.D., followed by the fall of Roman Syria and the Muslim conquest of the Levant. John and several bishops were summoned before Emir Umayr ibn Sad al-Ansari of Hims to engage in open debate regarding Christianity and represent the entire Christian community, including non-Syriac Orthodox communities, such as Greek Orthodox Syrians. The Emir demanded translations of the Gospels into Arabic to confirm John's beliefs, which according to the Chronicle of Michael the Syrian was the first translation of the Gospels into Arabic.

Transfer to new locations

During 1160, the patriarchate was transferred from Antioch to Mor Hananyo Monastery (Deir al. Zaʿfarān) in southeastern Anatolia near Mardin, where it remained until 1933 and re-established in Homs, Syria, due to the adverse political situation in Turkey. In 1959, the patriarchate was transferred to Damascus. The mother church and official seat of the Syriac Orthodox Church are now situated in Bab Tuma, Damascus, capital of Syria.

Middle Ages

The eighth-century hagiography Life of Jacob Baradaeus is evidence of a definite denominational and social differentiation between the Chalcedonians and Miaphysites (Syriac Orthodox). The longer hagiography shows that the Syriac Orthodox (called "Syriac Jacobites" in the work: suryoye yaquboye) self-identified with Jacob's story more than those of other saints. Coptic historian and miaphysite bishop Severus ibn al-Muqaffa (ca. 897) speaks of Jacobite origins, and on the veneration of Jacob Baradaeus. He explained that unlike the Chalcedonian Christians (who were labeled as "Melkites"), Miaphysite Jacobites never traded their Orthodoxy to win the favor of the Byzantine emperors, as the Melkites had done (malko is derived from "ruler, king, emperor").

In Antioch, after the 11th-century persecutions, the Syriac Orthodox population was almost extinguished. Only one Jacobite church is attested in Antioch in the first half of the 12th century, while a second and third are attested in the second half of the century, perhaps due to refugee influx. Dorothea Weltecke thus concludes that the Syriac Orthodox populace was very low in this period in Antioch and surroundings.

In the 12th century, several Syriac Orthodox Patriarchs visited Antioch and some established temporary residences. In the 13th century, the Syriac Orthodox hierarchy in Antioch was prepared to accept Latin supervision. In Adana, an anonymous 1137 report speaks of the entire population consisting of Syriac Orthodox. Before the advent of the Crusades, the Syriacs occupied most of the hill country of Jazirah (Upper Mesopotamia).

Early modern period
16th century

Moses of Mardin (fl. 1549–d. 1592) was a diplomat of the Syriac Orthodox Church in Rome in the 16th century.

17th century

By the early 1660s, 75% of the 5,000 Syriac Orthodox of Aleppo had converted to Catholicism following the arrival of mendicant missionaries. The Catholic missionaries had sought to place a Catholic Patriarch among the Jacobites and consecrated Andrew Akhijan as the Patriarch of the newly founded Syriac Catholic Church. The Propaganda Fide and foreign diplomats pushed for Akhijan to be recognized as the Jacobite Patriarch, and the Porte then consented and warned the Syriac Orthodox that they would be considered an enemy if they did not recognize him. Despite the warning and gifts to priests, frequent conflicts and violent arguments continued between the Catholic and Orthodox Syriacs. Around 1665, many Saint Thomas Christians of Kerala, India, committed themselves in allegiance to the Syriac Orthodox Church, which established the Malankara Syrian Church. The Malankara Church consolidated under Mar Thoma I welcomed Gregorios Abdal Jaleel, who regularised the canonical ordination of Mar Thoma I as a native democratically elected Bishop of the Malabar Syrian Christians.

Late modern period
In the 19th century, the various Syriac Christian denominations did not view themselves as part of one ethnic group. During the Tanzimat reforms (1839–78), the Syriac Orthodox was granted independent status by gaining recognition as their own millet in 1873, apart from Armenians and Greeks.

In the late 19th century, the Syriac Orthodox community of the Middle East, primarily from the cities of Adana and Harput, began the process of creating the Syriac diaspora, with the United States being one of their first destinations in the 1890s. Later, in Worcester, the first Syriac Orthodox Church in the United States was built.

Also in the late 1800s, the reformation faction of the Saint Thomas Christians in India left to form the Mar Thoma Syrian Church.

The 1895–96 massacres in Turkey affected the Armenian and Syriac Orthodox communities when an estimated 105,000 Christians were killed. By the end of the 19th century, 200,000 Syriac Orthodox Christians remained in the Middle East, most concentrated around Saffron Monastery, the Patriarchal Seat.

In 1870, there were 22 Syriac Orthodox settlements in the vicinity of Diyarbakır. In the 1870–71 Diyarbakır salnames, there were 1,434 Orthodox Syriacs in that city. On 10 December 1876, Ignatius Peter IV consecrated Geevarghese Gregorios of Parumala as metropolitan. Rivalry within the Syriac Orthodox Church in Tur Abdin resulted in many conversions to the Syriac Catholic Church (the Uniate branch).

Genocide (1914–1918)

The Ottoman authorities killed and deported Orthodox Syriacs, then looted and appropriated their properties. During 1915–16, the number of Orthodox Syriacs in the Diyarbakır province was reduced by 72%, and in the Mardin province by 58%.

Interwar period
In 1924, the patriarchate of the Church was transferred to Homs after Kemal Atatürk expelled the Syriac Orthodox Patriarch, who took the library of Deir el-Zaferan and settled in Damascus. The Syriac Orthodox villages in Tur Abdin suffered from the 1925–26 Kurdish rebellions and massive flight to Lebanon, northern Iraq and especially Syria ensued.

In the early 1920s, the city of Qamishli was built mainly by Syriac Orthodox refugees, escaping the Syriac genocide.

1945–2000

In 1959, the seat of the Syriac Orthodox Church was transferred to Damascus in Syria. In the mid-1970s, the estimate of Syriac Orthodox lived in Syria is 82,000. In 1977, the number of Syriac Orthodox followers in diaspora dioceses was: 9,700 in the Diocese of Middle Europe; 10,750 in the Diocese of Sweden and surrounding countries.

On 20 October 1987, Geevarghese Mar Gregorios of Parumala was declared a saint by Ignatius Zakka I Iwas, Patriarch permitting additions to the diptychs.

Leadership

Patriarch
The supreme head of the Syriac Orthodox Church is named Patriarch of Antioch, in reference to his titular pretense to one of the five patriarchates of the Pentarchy of Byzantine Christianity. Considered the "father of fathers", he must be an ordained bishop. He is the general administrator to Holy Synod and supervises the spiritual, administrative, and financial matters of the church. He governs external relations with other churches and signs agreements, treaties, contracts, pastoral encyclicals (bulls), pastoral letters related to the affairs of the church.

Maphrian or Catholicos of India
After the Patriarch, the second highest Rank in the Syriac Orthodox Church is that of the Maphrian or the Catholicos of India. He is important functionary in guiding the church when the patriarchate falls vacant after the death of a Patriarch, overseeing the election of the next Patriarch and leading the ceremony for the ordination of the Patriarch. The Maphrian's see is India and is the head of the Malankara Jacobite Syrian Church and is subject to the authority of the Patriarch. In joint councils the Maphrian is seated on the right side of the Patriarch and heads the church's regional synod in India with the Patriarch's sanction.

Archbishops and Bishops
The title bishop comes from the Greek word episkopos, meaning "the one who oversees". A bishop is a spiritual ruler of the church who has different ranks. Then there are metropolitan bishops or archbishops, and under them, there are auxiliary bishops.

Priests
The priest (Kasheesho) is the seventh rank and is the one duly appointed to administer the sacraments. Unlike in the Catholic Church, Syriac deacons may marry before ordained as priests; they cannot marry after ordained as priests. There is an honorary rank among the priests that are Corepiscopos who has the privileges of "first among the priests" and is given a chain with a cross and specific vestment decorations. Corepiscopos is the highest rank a married man can be elevated to in the Syriac Orthodox Church. The ranks above the Corepiscopos are unmarried.

Deacons
In the Syriac Orthodox tradition, different ranks among the deacons are specifically assigned with particular duties. The six ranks of the diaconate are:
 Ulmoyo (Faithful)
 Mawdyono (Confessor of faith)
 Mzamrono (Singer)
 Quroyo or Korooyo (Reader)
 Afudyaqno (Sub-deacon)
 Evangeloyo (High deacon)
 Masamsono (Full deacon)
Only a full deacon can take the censer during the Divine Liturgy to assist the priest. In Jacobite Syrian Christian Church, because of the lack of deacons, altar assistants who do not have a rank of deaconhood may assist the priest.

Historically, in the Malankara Church, the local chief was called as Archdeacon, who was the ecclesiastical authority of the Saint Thomas Christians in the Malabar region of India.

Deaconess
An ordained deaconess is entitled to enter the sanctuary only for cleaning, lighting the lamps and is limited to give Holy Communion to women and the children who are under the age of five. She can read scriptures, Holy Gospel in a public gathering. The name of deaconess can also be given to a choirgirl. Deaconess is not ordained as chanter before reaching fifteen years of age. The ministry of the deaconess assists the priest and deacon outside the altar including in the service of baptizing women and anointing them with holy chrism.

While this rank exists, it is rarely awarded.

 Worship 

 Bible 

Syriac Orthodox churches use the Peshitta (Syriac: simple, common) as its Bible. The New Testament books of this Bible are estimated to have been translated from Greek to Syriac between the late first century to the early third century AD. The Old Testament of the Peshitta was translated from Hebrew, probably in the second century. The New Testament of the Peshitta, which originally excluded certain disputed books, had become the standard by the early fifth century, replacing two early Syriac versions of the gospels.

 Doctrine 

The Syriac Orthodox Church theology is based on the Nicene Creed. The Syriac Orthodox Church teaches that it is the One, Holy, Catholic and Apostolic Church founded by Jesus Christ in his Great Commission, that its metropolitans are the successors of Christ's Apostles, and that the Patriarch is the successor to Saint Peter on whom primacy was conferred by Jesus Christ. The church accepted first three synods held at Nicaea (325), Constantinople (381), and Ephesus (431), shaping the formulation and early interpretation of Christian doctrines. The Syriac Orthodox Church is part of Oriental Orthodoxy, a distinct communion of churches claiming to continue the patristic and apostolic Christology before the schism following the Council of Chalcedon in 451. In terms of Christology, the Oriental Orthodox (Non-Chalcedonian) understanding is that Christ is "One Nature—the Logos Incarnate, of the full humanity and full divinity". Just as humans are of their mothers and fathers and not in their mothers and fathers, so too is the nature of Christ according to Oriental Orthodoxy. The Chalcedonian understanding is that Christ is "in two natures, full humanity and full divinity". This is the doctrinal difference that separated the Oriental Orthodox from the rest of Christendom. The church believes in the mystery of Incarnation and venerate Virgin Mary as Theotokos or Yoldath Aloho (Meaning: 'Bearer of God').

The Fathers of the Syriac Orthodox Church gave a theological interpretation to the primacy of Saint Peter. They were fully convinced of the unique office of Peter in the early Christian community. Ephrem, Aphrahat, and Maruthas unequivocally acknowledged the office of Peter. The different orders of liturgies used for sanctification of church buildings, marriages, ordinations etc., reveal that the primacy of Peter is a part of faith of the church. The church does not believe in Papal Primacy as understood by the Roman See, rather, Petrine Primacy according to the ancient Syriac tradition. The church uses both Julian calendar and Gregorian calendar based on their regions and traditions they adapted.

Language
Syriac language, as the most prominent variant of Aramaic language in the Christian era, is used by the Syriac Orthodox Church in two basic forms: Classical Syriac is traditionally employed as the main liturgical and literary language, while Neo-Aramaic (Neo-Syriac) dialect known as Turoyo is spoken as the most common vernacular language.
Arabic had become the dominant language of Syria, Lebanon, Palestine, and Egypt by the 11th century. Syriac Orthodox clergy wrote in Arabic using Garshūni, a Syriac script in the 15th century and later adopted the Arabic script. An English missionary in the 1840s noted that the Arabic speech of the Syriacs was intermixed with Syriac vocabulary. They chose Arabic and Muslim-sounding names, while women had Biblical names.
 Greek language was historically used (along with Syriac) in the earliest periods, during and after the separation (5th–6th centuries), but its use gradually declined.
English: Used Globally along with Syriac.
Malayalam, Tamil, Kannada are presently used in India. Suriyani Malayalam, also known as Karshoni or Syriac Malayalam, is a dialect of Malayalam written in a variant form of the Syriac alphabet which was popular among the Saint Thomas Christians (also known as Syrian Christians or Nasranis) of Kerala in India.Suriyani Malayalam, Nasrani Foundation It uses Malayalam grammar, the Maḏnḥāyā or "Eastern" Syriac script with special orthographic features, and vocabulary from Malayalam and East Syriac. This originated in the South Indian region of the Malabar Coast (modern-day Kerala). Until the 19th century, the script was widely used by Syrian Christians in Kerala.
Swedish, German, Dutch, Turkish, Spanish, Portuguese are used in diasporas along with Syriac.

 Liturgy 

The liturgical service is called Holy Qurobo in the Syriac language meaning "Eucharist". Liturgy of Saint James is celebrated on Sundays and special occasions. The Holy Eucharist consists of Gospel reading, Bible readings, prayers, and songs. The recitation of the Liturgy is performed according to with specific parts chanted by the presider, the lectors, the choir, and the congregated faithful, at certain times in unison. Apart from certain readings, prayers are sung in the form of chants and melodies. Hundreds of melodies remain preserved in the book known as Beth Gazo, the key reference to Syriac Orthodox church music.

 Prayer 
Syriac Orthodox clergy and laity follow a regimen of seven prayers a day that are said at fixed prayer times, in accordance with Psalm 119 (cf. Shehimo). According to the Syriac tradition, an ecclesiastical day starts at sunset and the Canonical hours are based on West Syriac Rite:
 Evening or Ramsho prayer (Vespers)
 Night prayer or Sootoro prayer (Compline)
 Midnight or Lilyo prayer (Matins)
 Morning or Saphro prayer (Prime or Lauds, 6 a.m.)
 Third Hour or tloth sho`in prayer (Terce, 9 a.m.)
 Sixth Hour or sheth sho`in prayer (Sext, noon)
 Ninth Hour or tsha` sho'in prayer (None, 3 p.m.)

 Sacraments 
The seven Holy Sacraments of the church are:

 Vestments 

The clergy of the Syriac Orthodox Church has unique liturgical vestments with their order in the priesthood: the deacons, the priests, the chorbishops, the bishops, and the patriarch each have different vestments.

Bishops usually wear a black or a red robe with a red belt. They should not wear a red robe in the presence of the patriarch, who wears a red robe. Bishops visiting a diocese outside their jurisdiction also wear black robes in deference to the bishop of the diocese, who alone wears red robes. They carry a crosier stylised with serpents representing the staff of Moses during sacraments. Corepiscopos wear a black or a purple robe with a purple belt. Bishops and corepiscopos have hand-held crosses.

A priest also wears a phiro, or a cap, which he must wear for the public prayers. Monks also wear eskimo, a hood. Priests also have ceremonial shoes which are called msone. Without wearing these shoes, a priest cannot distribute Eucharist to the faithful. Then there is a white robe called kutino symbolizing purity. Hamniko or stole is worn over this white robe. Then he wears a girdle called zenoro, and zende, meaning sleeves. If the celebrant is a bishop, he wears a masnapto, or turban (different from the turbans worn by Sikh men). A cope called phayno is worn over these vestments. Batrashil, or pallium, is worn over the phayno by bishops, like hamnikho worn by priests. The priest's usual dress is a black robe. In India, due to the hot weather, priests usually wear white robes except during prayers in the church, when they wear a black robe over the white one. Deacons wear a phiro, white kutino(robe) and of rank Quroyo and higher wear an uroro 'stole' in various shapes according to their rank. The deaconess wears a stole (uroro) hanging down from the shoulder in the  manner  of  an  archdeacon.

 Global presence 

 Demography 

The Patriarchate was initially established in Antioch (present-day Syria, Turkey, and Iraq), due to the persecutions by Romans followed by Muslim Arabs, the Patriarchate was seated in Mor Hananyo Monastery, Mardin, in the Ottoman Empire (1160–1933); following Homs (1933–1959); and Damascus, Syria, since 1959. Historically, the followers of the church are mainly ethnic Assyrians/Syriacs who comprise the indigenous pre-Arab populations of modern Syria, Iraq and southeastern Turkey.
A diaspora has also spread from the Levant, Iraq, and Turkey throughout the world, notably in Sweden, Germany, the United Kingdom, Netherlands, Austria, France, United States, Canada, Guatemala, Argentina, Brazil, Australia, and New Zealand.

The church's members are divided into 26 Archdioceses, and 13 Patriarchal Vicariates.

It is estimated that the church has 600,000 Syriac adherents, in addition to 2 million members of the Jacobite Syrian Christian Church and their own ethnic diaspora in India.  Additionally, there is also a large Syriac community among Mayan converts in Guatemala and South America numbering up to 1.5 million. According to scholar James Minahan around 26% of the Assyrian people belong to the Syriac Orthodox Church.

The number of Syriacs in Turkey is rising, due to refugees from Syria and Iraq fleeing ISIS, as well as Syriacs from the Diaspora who fled the region during the Turkey-PKK conflict (since 1978) returning and rebuilding their homes. The village of Kafro was populated by Syriacs from Germany and Switzerland.

In the Syriac diaspora, there are approximately 80,000 members in the United States, 80,000 in Sweden, 100,000 in Germany, 15,000 in the Netherlands, 200,000 members in Brazil, Switzerland, and Austria.

 Jurisdiction of the patriarchate 

The Syriac Orthodox Church of Antioch originally covered the whole region of the Middle East and India. In recent centuries, its parishioners started to emigrate to other countries over the world. Today, the Syriac Orthodox Church has several archdioceses and patriarchal vicariates (exarchates) in many countries covering six continents.
 Patron: The Patriarch of Antioch and All the East, the Supreme Head of the Universal Syriac Orthodox Church Ignatius Aphrem II.
 Patriarchal Seat: Cathedral of Saint George, Damascus, Syria
 Headquarters and patriarchal office: Damascus

 Americas 

The presence of the Syrian Orthodox faithful in America dates back to the late 19th century.

North America

 Patriarchal Vicariate of Eastern United States
 Patriarchal Vicariate of Western United States
 Malankara Archdiocese of North America
 Patriarchal Vicariate of Canada.

Central America

In the Guatemala region, a Charismatic movement emerged in 2003 was excommunicated in 2006 by the Roman Catholic Church later joined the church in 2013. Members of this archdiocese are Mayan in origin and live in rural areas, and display charismatic-type practices.

 Archdiocese of Central America, the Caribbean Islands and Venezuela

South America
 Patriarchal Vicariate of Argentina
 Patriarchal Vicariate of Brazil

 Eurasia 

Middle East regions
 Syria
 Lebanon
 Holy Land
 Iraq
 Turkey
 UAE
Syriac Orthodox Church in the Middle East and the diaspora, numbering between 150,000 and 200,000 people in their indigenous area of habitation in Syria, Iraq, and Turkey according to estimations.
The community formed and developed  in the Middle Ages. The Syriac Orthodox Christians of the Middle East speak Aramaic.
Archbishoprics in the Middle East include regions of Jazirah, Euphrates, Aleppo, Homs, Hama, Baghdad, Basrah, Diyarbakır, Mosul, Kirkuk, Kurdistan, Mount Lebanon, Beirut, Istanbul, Ankara and Adiyaman, Israel, Palestine, Jordan.

Patriarchal Vicariates in the Middle East includes Damascus, Mardin, Turabdin, Zahle, UAE and the Arab States of the Persian Gulf.

 India 
Syriac Orthodox Church of Malankara (India)

The Jacobite Syrian Christian Church, one of the various Saint Thomas Christian churches in India, is an integral part of the Syriac Orthodox Church, with the Patriarch of Antioch as its supreme head. The local head of the church in Malankara (Kerala) is Baselios Thomas I, ordained by Patriarch Ignatius Zakka I Iwas in 2002 and accountable to the Patriarch of Antioch. The headquarters of the church in India is at Puthencruz near Ernakulam in the state of Kerala in South India. Simhasana Churches and Honavar Mission is under the direct control of Patriarch. Historically, the St. Thomas Christians were part of the Church of the East, based in Persia which was under the Patriarch of Antioch until Council of Seleucia-Ctesiphon(410 AD.) and reunited with Syriac Orthodox Patriarchs of Antioch since  1652. Syriac monks Mar Sabor and Mar Proth arrived at Malankara between the eighth and ninth centuries from Persia. They established churches in Quilon, Kadamattom, Kayamkulam, Udayamperoor, and Akaparambu.

The Malankara Marthoma Syrian Church is an independent reformed church under the jurisdiction of Marthoma Metropolitan and its first Reforming Metropolitan Mathews Athanasius was ordained by Ignatius Elias II in 1842.  Maphrianate was re-established in Malankara in 1912 by Ignatius Abded Mshiho II by the consecration of Paulose I as first Catholicos. Malankara Orthodox Syrian Church accepts the Patriarch of Antioch only as its spiritual Father as stated by the constitution of 1934.

Knanaya Archdiocese

The Knanaya Syriac Orthodox Church is an archdiocese under the guidance and direction of Archbishop Severious Kuriakose with the patriarch as its spiritual head. They are the followers of the Syrian merchant Knāy Thoma (Thomas of Cana) in the fourth or eighth century, while another legend traces their origin to Jews in the Middle East.

Evangelistic Association of the East

E.A.E Arch Diocese is the missionary association of Syriac Orthodox Church founded in 1924 by Geevarghese Athunkal Cor-Episcopa at Perumbavoor. This archdiocese is under the direct control of the patriarch under the guidance of Chrysostomos Markose, It is an organization with churches, educational institutions, orphanages, old age homes, convents, publications, mission centers, gospel teams, care missions, and a missionary training institute. It is registered in 1949 under the Indian Societies Registration Act. XXI of 1860 (Reg. No. S.8/1949ESTD 1924).

Europe

Earlier in the 20th century many Syrian Orthodox immigrated to Western Europe diaspora, located in the Sweden, Netherlands, Germany, and Switzerland for economic and political reasons. Dayro d-Mor Ephrem in Netherlands is the first Syriac Orthodox monastery in Europe established in 1981. Dayro d-Mor Awgen, Arth, Switzerland,Dayro d-Mor Ya`qub d-Sarug, Warburg, Germany are the other monasteries located in Europe.

Patriarchal Vicariates:

 Belgium, France and Luxembourg
 Germany
 Netherlands
 Spain
 Sweden
 Switzerland and Austria
 United Kingdom

 Oceania 

Australia and New Zealand
 Patriarchal Vicariate of Australia and New Zealand under Archbishop Malatius Malki Malki.

 Institutions 
The church has various seminaries, colleges, and other institutions. Patriarch Aphrem I Barsoum established St. Aphrem's Clerical School in 1934 in Zahlé. In 1946, the school was moved to Mosul, where it provided the church with a selection of graduates, the first among them being Patriarch Ignatius Zakka I Iwas and many other church leaders. In 1990, the Order of St. Jacob Baradaeus was established for nuns. Seminaries have been instituted in Sweden and in Salzburg for the study of Syriac theology, history, language, and culture. Happy Child House project started in 2019 provides childcare services in Damascus, Syria.
The church has an international Christian education center for religious education.
The Antioch Syrian University was established on 8 September 2018 in Maarat Saidnaya, near Damascus.
The university is offering engineering, management and economics courses.

 Ecumenical relations 

The Syriac Orthodox Church is active in ecumenical dialogues with various churches, including the Catholic Church, Eastern Orthodox Churches, Anglican Communion, Syriac Church of the East, and other Christian denominations. The Church is an active member of the World Council of Churches since 1960 and Patriarch Ignatius Zakka I Iwas was one of the former presidents of WCC. It has also been involved in the Middle East Council of Churches since 1974. There are common Christological and pastoral agreements with the Catholic Church by the 20th century as the Chalcedonian schism was not seen with the same relevance, and from several meetings between the authorities of the Catholic Church and the Oriental Orthodoxy, reconciling declarations emerged in the common statements of the Patriarch Ignatius Jacob III and Pope Paul VI in 1971, Patriarch Ignatius Zakka I Iwas and Pope John Paul II in 1984:

The precise differences in theology that caused the Chalcedonian controversy is said to have arisen "only because of differences in terminology and culture and in the various formulae adopted by different theological schools to express the same matter", according to a common declaration statement between Patriarch Ignatius Jacob III and Pope Paul VI on Wednesday 27 October 1971. In 2015, Pope Francis addressed the Syriac Orthodox Church as "a Church of Martyrs'' " welcoming the visit of Ignatius Aphrem II to Holy See. In 2015, Ignatius Aphrem II visited Patriarch Kirill of Moscow of the Russian Orthodox Church and discussed prospects of bilateral and theological dialogue existing since the late 1980s.
Since 1998, representatives of SOC, together with representatives of other Oriental Orthodox Churches, participate in the Ecumenical dialogue, and also in various forms of the Interfaith dialogue.

 Communities 
 Syrians/Syriacs originating from Middle East
 Turabdin in Turkey, former Syriac cultural heartland
 Saffron Monastery, important site in Turabdin
 St. Thomas Christians in India
 Malankara Jacobite Syrian Orthodox Church
 Catholicos of India (Maphrian)
 Södertälje, Swedish town with many Syriac people and churches
 Guatemalans (recent convert activity)

Notable people
 
 
Ignatius of Antioch
Severus of Antioch
Ignatius Aphrem II
Jacob Baradaeus
Saint Peter
Simeon Stylites
Ephrem the Syrian
Baselios Thomas I
Ignatius Zakka I

 See also 

 Dioceses of the Syriac Orthodox Church
 List of Syriac Orthodox Patriarchs of Antioch
 Naheere
 Oriental Orthodoxy
 Miaphysitism, Cyril of Alexandria's Christology
 Patriarchate of Alexandria
 Syriac Christianity
 Chaldean Catholic Church
 Church of the East
 Syriac Catholic Church

 References 

Bibliography

 
 
 
 
 
 
 

 
 
 
 
 
 
 
 
 
 
 
 
 
 
 

 
 
 

 
 
 
 
 
 

 

 
 
 

 
 
 
 
 
 
 
 
 

 
 
 
 
 
 
 

 
 
 
 
 

 
 
 
 
 
 

 
 

 
 
 
 
 
 
 
 
 
 
 
 
 

 
 
 

 
 
 
 
 

 
 
 

 
 
 
 
 
 
 

 
 
 
 
 

 
 
 
 
 

 
 

Further readingEcumenical relations with the Catholic Church Pope Benedict XIV, Allatae Sunt (On the observance of Oriental Rites), Encyclical, 1755
 Addresses of Pope Paul VI and His Holiness Mar Ignatius Jacob III, 1971
 Common Declaration of Pope John Paul II and His Holiness Mar Ignatius Zakka I Iwas, 1984
 Address of John Paul II on Occasion of the Visit to the Catholicos of the Malankarese Syrian Orthodox Church, 1986
 Address of His Holiness Pope Francis to His Holiness Mor Ignatius Aphrem II Syriac orthodox patriarch of Antioch and all the East, 19 June 2015

 External links 

 Syriac Orthodox Patriarchate (Official website)
Syriac Orthodox Patriarchate (Union between Christians)
 Department of Syriac StudiesMedia 
 Syriac religious TV channel of Syriac Orthodox Patriarchate of Antioch
 Syriac Liturgy description and photos
 Syriac Music Online
YouTube video of a Palm Sunday Mass
YouTube video: Associate professor Svante Lundgren explains the history and origin of the term "Syriac" (Suryoyo/Suroyo)Relating to Syriac Orthodox Church Margonitho: Syriac Orthodox ResourcesRelating to Malankara Jacobite Syrian Orthodox Church'''
 News Site Of Jacobite Syrian Orthodox Church
 Malankara Vision: TV Of Jacobite Syrian Church
 Radio Malankara: Radio of Jacobite Syrian Church

 
Christian denominations established in the 6th century
6th-century establishments in Asia
Eastern Christianity
International Christian organizations
Organizations based in Damascus